CarnEvil is a 1998 light gun shooter arcade game released by Midway Games. It is often noted for its heavy use of graphic violence and dark humor. It is Midway Games' most successful light gun shooter.

Gameplay

CarnEvil plays similarly to Sega's House of the Dead series. It consists of four levels, each ending with a boss fight. The first three levels (Haunted House, Rickety Town, Freak Show) can be played in any order, but the fourth (Big Top) can only be accessed after all three are cleared. The players shoot enemies while progressing through carnival and amusement park environments. The gameplay is considerably violent and features various gory scenes. The controller is a pump-action shotgun attached to the cabinet by a cable; to reload, players must either pump the fore-end or fire off-screen.

Occasionally, a girl named Betty will appear as an innocent civilian. Shooting her gives a life penalty, but does not garner any long-term consequences or changes to the game.

Health and weapon power-ups can be found throughout the game. Weapon power-ups include a machine gun, shotgun, flamethrower, acid bath gun, and an increase in the magazine capacity for the standard gun. They can be obtained by shooting floating icons, such as a shotgun shell or a barrel of acid. The special weapons cannot be reloaded, but the magazine increase remains in effect until the player's health meter is exhausted. Grabbing these power-ups also provides bonus points.

Plot
The game is set in the fictional town of Greely Valley, Iowa. An urban legend claims that if a golden token is inserted into the jester skull's mouth on top of the gravestone of a ringmaster named Professor Ludwig von Tökkentäkker, his haunted carnival will rise from the earth.

The game begins with a group of teenagers taking a hayride tour through the Greely Valley cemetery, courtesy of the local "ghost expert" Spooky Sam. The unnamed protagonist leaves the tour and approaches Tökkentäkker's tombstone to find a golden coin sitting in its slot. The protagonist inserts the coin into the jester's mouth, resulting in the haunted amusement park rising from the ground. Trapped within, he takes a shotgun from the shooting gallery and uses it to fight off hordes of zombies and other undead monsters in order to escape. After fighting through the Haunted House, Rickety Town, and the Freak Show, he enters the Big Top and fights his way in order to face Tökkentäkker directly aboard his airship.

Soon after killing Tökkentäkker, the protagonist falls from the airship as it explodes. In the morning, he and the only other survivor, Betty, wake up in front of the tombstone, where the token falls back into its slot. The protagonist re-inserts it into the mouth of the jester, causing it to laugh wickedly as Betty screams in horror.

Development and release
CarnEvil was conceptualized by Jack Haeger in 1988 when he was working on the video game Narc. As part of the development team's experiments with live digitized footage for video games, Haegar began working with stop motion puppets in an attempt to recreate a cinematic experience. Haegar was fond of the classic horror movie premise of a teenager daring a friend to run through a graveyard, and sketched a concept piece based on this idea titled "Horror Show". The sketch, primarily depicting a decrepit haunted house, featured a poster with the "CarnEvil" name and a prototypical version of Umlaut named "Smeek". Although Haeger was aware that technical limitations at the time made the concept impractical, he saw potential in the "dark carnival" theme.

Midway Games approved Haeger's concept following the successful releases of the light gun shooters Terminator 2: Judgment Day (1991) and Revolution X (1994), which Haegar co-directed. The game originally had a tone similar to The Haunted Mansion, and featured an old caretaker character with a Punch and Judy-style puppet. After this version was harshly reviewed by Midway's management, the development team revamped the concept with characters that were more aggressive and darkly humorous. This tone was set by Haeger's conceptual character Hambone, a large brute with a goaltender mask and a gatling gun arm who would become the miniboss of the Haunted House stage. Over 40 characters were created and modeled in 3D Studio Max. Artist and 3D modeler Scott Pikulski recalled that "Many ideas for characters and level content came from us just joking around while working on the game. It always felt like the project would be cancelled at any time, so we worked on it like we had nothing to lose. Jack has a great sense of humor, and many of the great ideas came from his head".

The spindly, angular qualities of Haeger's concept sketches were influenced by The Nightmare Before Christmas, while the expressive and disturbing qualities of the characters' faces were inspired by a black-and-white photobook titled Fellini's Faces. The Avengers episode "Look — (Stop Me If You've Heard This One) — But There Were These Two Fellers...", which features a pair of murderous clowns, was also an influence. The fatalities in Midway's Mortal Kombat pushed the development team to increase the game's graphic violence, with Pikulski responsible for many of the game's goriest effects. However, in response to objections from potential distributors, the development team installed a DIP switch that would allow operators to replace the giant infant boss character Junior with a giant teddy bear character named Deaddy. The opening and closing cutscenes were created by Blur Studio under the direction of Tim Miller. The music was composed by Kevin Quinn. Haeger voiced the game's opening narration as well as the characters Umlaut, Tökkentäkker, Hambone and Krampus. The enemy character Muertito the Bat Boy was created and voiced by artist Martin Martinez.

In September 1998, CarnEvil was showcased at the Amusement & Music Operators Association Expo in Nashville, Tennessee. It was released on Halloween 1998, and it was considered a competitor to Atari Games's Area 51: Site 4 and Namco's Time Crisis II. In 1999, Midway confirmed that the game would not be ported to consoles.

Reception and legacy
Mark Hain of Electronic Gaming Monthly praised the game's visuals and comfortable pump action gun, but was disappointed by the lack of extra gameplay features and hidden background secrets compared to Atari Games' Area 51 and Maximum Force. Jason Wilson and Tyrone Rodriguez of Tips & Tricks also praised the graphics, writing that "the stunning 3D environments are portrayed in such gruesome detail, you will think you're trapped in a horror film". French magazine Player One gave the game a score of 69%, regarding it as a House of the Dead clone, but commending the gun's design and precision as well as the gory graphics. Adam Bregman of LA Weekly considered CarnEvil to be "undoubtedly the best of the genre" and "perhaps the most twisted video game ever created".

According to Haeger, the game's sales exceeded those of Mortal Kombat 4, which encouraged Midway's arcade team to conceptualize a 4D ride adaptation that ultimately never materialized. CarnEvil was never ported to home consoles despite the success of The House of the Dead, Time Crisis and Point Blank on those platforms. Pikulski claimed that a developer had intended to create an original home console game that bore the CarnEvil title.

In September 2015, the fansite "Greely Valley Cemetery" was created as an archive for the game's concept sketches, promotional art, music tracks and voice clips. Lucas Sullivan of GamesRadar+ considered Killing Floor and its sequel to be spiritual successors to CarnEvil, and he saw a thematic influence on the "Loony Park" level in Painkiller'''s Battle Out of Hell expansion pack and Until Dawn: Rush of Blood''.

References

External links
 

1998 video games
Amusement parks in fiction
Atari games
Arcade-only video games
Light gun games
Midway video games
Halloween video games
Multiplayer and single-player video games
Rail shooters
Video games about zombies
Video games developed in the United States
Video games set in amusement parks
Video games set in the United States
Video games with pre-rendered 3D graphics